Muir Pass is a mountain pass in the Sierra Nevada of California, United States, in Kings Canyon National Park. It is named for John Muir.

The pass is near the midway point of the John Muir Trail and around mile 841 of the Pacific Crest Trail. The Muir Hut, built by the Sierra Club, is at the summit of the pass. Although the grade is gentle from both directions, snow can persist well into the summer, obscuring the trail for miles.

Notes

Kings Canyon National Park
Landforms of Fresno County, California
Mountain passes on the John Muir Trail